Liotia admirabilis is a species of sea snail, a marine gastropod mollusk in the family Liotiidae.

Description
The shell grows to a length of 1 mm and a diameter of 1.3 mm. The shell has a depressed globose shape. It is strongly sculptured and profoundly umbilicated. The shell contains 3½ whorls. The uppermost of the keels on the body whorl revolves up to the spire and forms the angle on the upper volutions. The lowermost carina borders the umbilicus and the next one occupies the middle of the under surface. The longitudinal lamellae are continuous on and between the keels. The aperture is round.

Distribution
This species occurs in the Atlantic Ocean off St Helena

References

External links
 To Biodiversity Heritage Library (3 publications)
 To Encyclopedia of Life
 To World Register of Marine Species

admirabilis
Gastropods described in 1890